RV Point Lobos was a research vessel operated by the Monterey Bay Aquarium Research Institute (MBARI). It was the platform of operations for the ROV Ventana.

Specifications
 

Fuel Capacity: 10,000 gal

Potable Water: 2500 gal

Ballast: 44,500 gal (bunker capacity)

Lube Oil: 350 ga; hydraulic oil: 350 gal

Sewage: 250 Gal

ENGINEERING MACHINERY

2 Detroit Diesel 16V92 main engines.	

2 Twin Disk 520 Reduction Gears

2 150 kW Northern Lights Gen Sets

1 Kaiser SM-11 rotary screw air compressor

1 Independent Hydraulic System

DECK MACHINERY

1 Hiab 290 Sea Crane

1 Jeamar Hydraulic Winch #8-3007 aft

1 Jeamar 480 Electric Winch #83007 forward

1 2500m heave compensated Tether Management System

SAFETY EQUIPMENT

1 300# CO2 Fixed Engine Room Extinguisher

3 Fixed Sea Water Hose Stations (2 deck, 1 engine room)

1 ACR 121.5/406MHZ EPIRB

ELECTRONICS/COMMUNICATIONS

Call Sign WDE5005

3 VHF Horizon Galaxy, Horizon Titan, Icom IC M-100

1 SSB IC M-700 radio

1 Telex Ship Board Comms System, cw telex BTR 200 wireless

1 Raytheon Ray 410 Loud Hailer

1 Motorola Cellular SCN 2449A

1 Furuno FR-1510D 72 mile Radar

1 Trimble 4000DL Differential GPS + Garmin GPS with CG diff GPS 100

1 Sperry MK37 Gyro Compass

1 Furuno FCV252 Depth Sounder

References

External links 
 MBARI Marine Operations

Research vessels of the United States
Monterey Bay Aquarium